The Sonora mud turtle (Kinosternon sonoriense), also known as the Sonoyta mud turtle, is a species of turtle in the Kinosternidae family. It is found in Mexico and the United States. 
The Sonoran mud turtle species is heavily influenced by its environment. Depending on the amount of water available due to fixed water sources or rainfall, is how tolerant the mud turtle is to drought. The species drought tolerance is extremely variable depending on its environment.

Distribution 
 Mexico: Chihuahua and Sonora.
 United States: Arizona and New Mexico (extirpated in California).

Subspecies 
Sonora mud turtle (subspecies) - Kinosternon sonoriense sonoriense (Le Conte, 1854)
Sonoyta mud turtle - Kinosternon sonoriense longifemorale (Inverson, 1981)

References

Sources 
 Tortoise & Freshwater Turtle Specialist Group 1996.  Kinosternon sonoriense.   2006 IUCN Red List of Threatened Species.   Downloaded on 29 July 2007.
 LeConte, 1854 : Description of four new species of Kinosternum. Proceedings of the Academy of Natural Sciences of Philadelphia, vol. 7, p. 180–190 (integral text).
Ligon, Db, et al. “Physiological and Behavioral Variation in Estivation among Mud Turtles ( Kinosternon Spp.).” Physiological and Biochemical Zoology., vol. 75, no. 3, 2002, pp. 283–293., https://doi.org/10.1086/342000. 
Stone, P. A. (2001). Movements and Demography of the Sonoran Mud Turtle, Kinosternon sonoriense. The Southwestern Naturalist, 46(1), 41–53. https://doi.org/10.2307/3672372

Kinosternon
Turtles of North America
Reptiles of Mexico
Reptiles of the United States
Fauna of the Sonoran Desert
Fauna of the Southwestern United States
Fauna of the Colorado Desert
Fauna of the Yuma Desert
Natural history of Arizona
Natural history of Chihuahua (state)
Natural history of New Mexico
Natural history of Sonora
Reptiles described in 1854
Taxonomy articles created by Polbot